Coach Trip 8 aired from 30 January to 9 March 2012 after the third celebrity series finished and is the eighth and final series of Coach Trip in the United Kingdom before the 2012 Summer Olympics and Paralympics. It was filmed from Monday 29 August until Saturday 1 October 2011 (after the England riots ended). The length of this series was the same as the previous non-celebrity series but with only 1 day of a weekend included at the end of the tour. The Mediterranean tour centring towards Western Asia began in the UK, before moving to the Netherlands, Germany, Austria, Italy, Greece, Bulgaria, North Macedonia (for the first time) and finishing in Turkey. Tour guide Brendan Sheerin, coach driver Paul Donald, narrator Dave Vitty and the coach with registration number MT09 MTT all returned for this series, which was aired on Channel 4 with the airing time moved to 5:30pm again, a similar start to series 3 and a similar end to series 4.

Contestants

Voting history

Notes

No post-vote arrivals, timekeepers or removals in series

The Trip Day-by-Day

{| class="wikitable" style="text-align:center;"
|-
! rowspan=2 |Day
! rowspan=2 |Location
! colspan=2 |Activity
|-
! Morning
! Afternoon
|-
| 1
| Chelmsford
| Essex-style makeover
|
|-
| 2
| Amsterdam
| Flower arranging
| Ski slopes
|-
| 3
| Utrecht
| The art of flirting
|
|-
| 4
| Essen
| Baking bread
| Indoor skydiving
|-
| 5
| Koblenz
| Land art tour
| Cheerleading lesson
|-
| 6
| Mannheim
| Curry sauce making
| Baseball
|-
| 7
| Stuttgart
|  Beer tasting
| River racing
|-
| 8
| Friedrichshafen
| Segway racing
| Zeppelin museum
|-
| 9
| Innsbruck
| Tai chi
| Bungee jump
|-
| 10
| Val Gardena
| Wood-carving lesson
| Llama racing
|-
| 11
| Lake Garda
| 
|
|-
| 12
| Padua
| Biblical history lesson
| Spa
|-
| 13
| Treviso & Venice
| Pasta making
| Golf
|-
| 14
| Adriatic Sea
| Sailing
|
|-
| 15
| Preveza
| Olive picking
| Beach
|-
| 16
| Arta, Greece
| Fishing
| Dance class
|-
| 17
| Dodoni
| Ancient theatre
| Goat-milking
|-
| 18
| Ioannina
| Rafting trip
| Jewellery workshop
|-
| 19
| Grevena
| Truffle hunting
| Painting
|-
| 20
| Thessaloniki
| Snorkelling
| Cocktail making
|-
| 21
| Kavadarci
| Bulgarian dance lesson
| Grape squashing
|-
| 22
| Skopje
| Mother Teresa's birthplace
| Kite-flying
|-
| 23
| Kyustendil
| Local baths
| Clay making
|-
| 24
| Sofia
| Zoo keeping
| Zorbing
|-
| 25
| Plovdiv
| Gymnastics
| Rowing
|-
| 26
| Haskovo
| Cooking lesson
| Go-karting
|-
| 27
| Edirne
| Soap molding
| Local baths
|-
| 28
| Silivri
| Belly dancing
| Turkish wrestling
|-
| 29
| Istanbul
| Spice market
| Swimming with dolphins
|-
| 30
| colspan="3" |}
It's the long journey home for the coach tripper and Brendan reminisces about the last six weeks on the road.

References

2012 British television seasons
Coach Trip series
Television in North Macedonia
Television shows set in Austria
Television shows set in Bulgaria
Television shows set in Essex
Television shows set in Germany
Television shows set in Greece
Television shows set in Italy
Television shows set in the Netherlands
Television shows set in Turkey